Mount Ambrose is a northeastern suburb of Redruth in west Cornwall, England. It falls within Redruth Central division on Cornwall Council,

Recreation 

Cricket
Mount Ambrose Cricket Club

Football
Mount Ambrose FC

Darts
Mount Ambrose Darts

Table Tennis
Mount Ambrose Table Tennis Club

References

Populated places in Cornwall
Redruth